Charles-Claude Flahaut de la Billarderie, comte d'Angiviller  (1730–1809) was the director of the Bâtiments du Roi, a forerunner of a minister of fine arts in charge of the royal building works, under Louis XVI of France, from 1775. Through Flahaut, virtually all official artistic patronage flowed.

His portrait by Joseph-Siffred Duplessis, 1779, is conserved in the Musée du Louvre.

In 1784, he was elected a member of the American Philosophical Society.

After the Revolution he was accused of mishandling public property and emigrated, settling in Hamburg, where he died in 1809.

References
 Jacques Silvestre de Sacy, 1953. Le Comte d'Angiviller, dernier directeur général des Bâtiments du Roi, Paris, Éditions d'histoire et d'art, Plon, Collection ″Ars et historia″
 Jean de Viguerie, 2003. Histoire et dictionnaire du temps des Lumières. 1715-1789, Paris, Robert Laffont, collection Bouquins.

Notes

Counts of Angiviller
18th-century French politicians
1730 births
1810 deaths
People associated with the Louvre